The surname Leo may refer to:

 Angelo Leo (born 1994), American boxer
 Daniel Leo (mobster) (born 1928), American organized crime figure
 Daniel Leo (rugby union) (born 1982), Samoan rugby player
 Edoardo Leo (born 1972), Italian actor, director and screenwriter
 Efraim Leo (born 1997), Swedish singer and songwriter
 Friedrich Leo (1851–1914), German classical philologist
 Henning Leo (1885–1953), Swedish politician
 Juliusz Leo (1861–1918), Polish politician
 Leo KoGuan (born 1955), Chinese American businessman
 Leonard Leo (born 1965), American lawyer 
 Leonardo Leo (1694–1744), Neapolitan composer
 Matt Leo (born 1992), Australian-American football player
 Melissa Leo (born 1960), American actress
 Paul Leo (1893–1958), German Lutheran pastor and theologian
 Ted Leo (born 1970), American musician

See also
 Leo (given name)
 Leos (disambiguation)

Surnames from nicknames
Latin-language surnames